Graham John Zellick  (born 12 August 1948) is a former Vice-Chancellor of the University of London, serving from 1997–2003 and previously Principal of Queen Mary and Westfield College, London,
from 1991–98.

Early life
The son of R. H. Zellick and B. Sabovinsky, he was educated at Christ's College in Finchley, north London, before going up to Gonville and Caius College, Cambridge (MA, PhD) then Stanford Law School, where he was a Ford Foundation Fellow from 1970–71.

Positions
Professor Zellick served as Electoral Commissioner (2001–06) and was for nearly 20 years an academic lawyer at QMUL, where he was Head of the Department of Law, Dean of the Faculty of Laws, Professor of Public Law and Drapers' Professor of Law. He was also Chairman of the Committee of Heads of UK Law Schools and a member of the Lord Chancellor's Committee on Legal Education.

He was Editor of Public Law and founding Editor of European Human Rights Reports, as well as a member of the Data Protection Tribunal, the Criminal Injuries Compensation Appeals Panel, the Competition Appeal Tribunal, the Lord Chancellor's Advisory Committee and a member of the Legal Aid and the Criminal Justice Council. Also appointed a magistrate, he is a qualified barrister and Master of the Bench of the Middle Temple.

Zellick is an Honorary Fellow of Gonville and Caius College, Cambridge, a Fellow of the Institute for Advanced Legal Studies and an Academician of the Academy of Social Sciences. An Emeritus Professor of Law of the University of London, Visiting Professor of Law of Queen Mary and Honorary Professor of Law of the University of Birmingham, he has also been elected a Fellow of the Royal Society of Arts, an Honorary Fellow of the Royal Academy of Music and a Companion of the Chartered Management Institute. Zellick was, in 2010, a Distinguished Visiting Fellow to the New Zealand Law Foundation.

Honours

Zellick was appointed a Commander of the Order of the British Empire in 2009 "for services to the administration of justice" and took silk (QC) in 2010.

Personal life
In 1975 he married Jennifer Temkin CBE (Professor of Law of the University of Sussex, 1992–2012, now Emerita) and they have one son and one daughter.

See also
 List of Vice-Chancellors of the University of London

References

1948 births
Living people
English King's Counsel
People educated at Christ's College, Finchley
Alumni of Gonville and Caius College, Cambridge
Stanford University alumni
Commanders of the Order of the British Empire
Vice-Chancellors of the University of London
Ford Foundation fellowships
Honorary King's Counsel